Macrodactylus known as rose chafers are a genus in the family Scarabaeidae. There are at least 110 described species in Macrodactylus.

See also
 List of Macrodactylus species

References

Further reading

External links

 

Melolonthinae
Scarabaeidae genera